The Gold Coast railway line is an interurban railway line operated by Queensland Rail in Queensland, Australia, connecting Brisbane with the Gold Coast.  The line currently includes stops at 17 stations. In 2021, a journey from Central station to the terminus of this line is scheduled to take 1 hour 23 minutes. Several new stations along the existing line and an extension south are planned.

History

The Beenleigh railway line opened in 1885 before being extended as the South Coast Line to Southport in 1889. A branch line to Tweed Heads, New South Wales was opened in 1903 with excursion trains travelling the line on 10 August 1903 and the first passenger train making the journey from Brisbane on 14 September 1903. Due to the increasing popularity of the motor car, and political interests in road transport, the Tweed Heads branch closed in 1961 and the line from Beenleigh to Southport closed in 1964.

The new Gold Coast railway opened on a different alignment from Beenleigh to Helensvale in 1996, Nerang in 1997, and Robina in 1998. In 2009, the line was extended to Varsity Lakes. There are plans to extend the line to Elanora and the Coolangatta airport by 2031.

Originally built as a single-track railway, the rail tracks on Gold Coast line were progressively duplicated in stages. The final section of the line to be duplicated was between Coomera and Helensvale stations, with work completed in late 2017, and the new track operational in 2018.

Route

The Gold Coast (Varsity Lakes) railway line is an extension of the Beenleigh line. Trains travel express between Park Road and Beenleigh stations, with limited stops (currently at Altandi and Loganlea) on the Beenleigh railway line. During events at the Queensland Sport and Athletics Centre, Gold Coast and Brisbane Airport trains will make a stop at Banoon station. Most trains from the Gold Coast run through to Brisbane Airport, allowing tourists and locals access to more international destinations than from the Gold Coast's own airport.

Prior to 20 January 2014, services on the Gold Coast Line travelled express between South Bank and Beenleigh, stopping only at Park Road, Coopers Plains and Loganlea during off-peak hours.

From 2025 the line will utilise Cross River Rail and stop at the three new stations in the inner city.

Extension plans
The South East Queensland Infrastructure Plan and Program of the Bligh Labor government included a proposal to extend the line to the Coolangatta Airport terminal. This was also included in the Labor government's "Connecting SEQ2031" infrastructure plan.

The proposed alignment parallels the Pacific Motorway before passing under the threshold of runway 32 at the Gold Coast Airport and looping around to the terminus, near the airport carpark. Under the South East Queensland Infrastructure Plan and Program, land reservations were proposed for possible new infill stations between Beenleigh and Ormeau (Yatala is a prime candidate) and at Pimpama, Coomera North, Helensvale North, Parkwood and Merrimac on the existing line. Further triplication north of Beenleigh has also been proposed. The cost of extending the line to the airport has been costed at around $2.8 billion.

An extension to the G:link light rail system was announced in October 2015. Beginning at Helensvale station, the line was extended to the former terminus at Gold Coast University Hospital, and now continues via the previously built line to Southport, Surfers Paradise and Broadbeach. The extension was opened in December 2017 in time for the 2018 Commonwealth Games.

New stations 
As part of the Cross River Rail project, three new stations will be built along the existing line at Pimpama, Hope Island and Merrimac. The first one will be built by 2024, while four other ones are planned at Tallebudgera, Elanora, Tugun, and Gold Coast Airport once the line is extended. The Cross River Rail project will allow trains to depart on the line every five minutes during peak periods

Line guide, frequency and services
Typical service frequency on the Gold Coast railway line are two trains per hour, increasing to six trains per hour in peak periods. Gold Coast services generally run express between Beenleigh railway station and Park Road railway station, with stops at Loganlea Station and Altandi Station.  The typical travel time between Varsity Lakes and Brisbane City is approximately 79 minutes (to Central).

Most services generally continue as the Airtrain service to Brisbane Airport, stopping at the International and Domestic terminals.

Passengers for/from the Beenleigh line change at either Beenleigh, Loganlea or Altandi, Cleveland line at Park Road, Ipswich/Rosewood/Springfield lines at Roma Street, Ferny Grove at Bowen Hills and all other Northbound lines at Eagle Junction.

Shortcomings were exposed by unexpectedly high passenger take-up during the construction of the Pacific Motorway, exacerbated by the extension of the service to Brisbane Airport while failing to provide for the additional passengers' baggage. Before a 2010 upgrade in peak-services, previously many peak-hour commuters had to stand for much of the 70-minute journey.

In 2010, services on the line was found to be the most delayed in the state. Delays were caused by a number of factors including signal failure and severe weather conditions.

See also

 Rail transport in Queensland

References

External links

Queensland Rail
TransLink, includes train timetables.

Public transport on the Gold Coast, Queensland
Brisbane railway lines
Railway lines opened in 1996
Logan City
1996 establishments in Australia